Anelcanidae is an extinct family of long-horned Orthoptera. There are at least two genera and two described species in Anelcanidae.

Genera
These two genera belong to the family Anelcanidae:
 † Anelcana Carpenter, 1986
 † Petrelcana Carpenter, 1966

References

Ensifera